Ray Brook is a hamlet in New York State, United States located on NY 86 between Saranac Lake and Lake Placid  in the Town of North Elba in Essex County.  It is the site of the Adirondack Park Agency, the District 5 office of the New York State Department of Environmental Conservation, the Federal Correctional Institution, Ray Brook and the Adirondack Correctional Facility. The New York State Office of Real Property Tax Services—an office within the New York State Department of Taxation and Finance—has an office here as well.  The ZIP Code for Ray Brook is 12977.

In 1904, it was the site of the first state-operated tuberculosis sanatorium. Subsequent to the development of effective treatments for tuberculosis, the property was used by the Drug Addiction Control Commission for enforcement and treatment in 1971.   Later it was used for Olympic staff housing for the 1980 Winter Olympics and for the Olympic Village; after the games it became a new state prison, and  deeded to the federal government became a new federal prison.

The New York State Department of Environmental Conservation, Region 5, is headquartered in Raybrook; it operates the Meadowbrook Campground across the road from its offices.

The headquarters of the New York State Police Troop B was built in Ray Brook in 1979; Troop B is responsible for Clinton, Essex, Franklin, Hamilton and St. Lawrence counties.

References

External links
Ray Brook Meadowbrook Campground

Hamlets in Essex County, New York
Hamlets in New York (state)